NGC 7250 is an irregular galaxy located in the Lacerta constellation. It is a blue-colored galaxy with bright bursts of star formation: its star-forming rate is more than an order of magnitude greater than that of the Milky Way.

In 2013, a type Ia supernova was detected within the galaxy, and was designated SN 2013dy. It was detected about 2.4 hours after the explosion, making it the earliest-known detection of a supernova at the time.

The brighter star located in front of the galaxy is named TYC 3203-450-1, and is barely studied. It is about a million times closer to Earth than it the galaxy itself.

References

External links
 

Lacerta (constellation)
7250
11980
068535